Alessandro Verde (27 March 1865 – 29 March 1958) was an Italian Roman Catholic Cardinal and Archpriest of the Basilica di Santa Maria Maggiore.

Early life
He was born in Sant'Antimo, and educated at the Seminary of Aversa, where he was ordained. Later, he continued his studies at the Pontifical Roman Seminary of "S. Apollinare", where he received doctorates in theology in 1890 and a doctorate utroque iuris (in both canon and civil law) 1893.

He worked in the Roman Curia after his studies and worked in the Diocese of Rome. He served as a professor of civil law at the Pontifical Roman Athenaeum "S. Apollinare" from 1896 until 1897. He was created Privy chamberlain of His Holiness on 1897. He worked as an assessor of the Congregation for the Evangelization of Peoples from 1897. He was elevated to the level of Domestic prelate of His Holiness on 16 January 1902. He was appointed Secretary of the Congregation for the Causes of Saints on 26 June 1915.

Cardinal
He was created Cardinal-Deacon of S. Maria in Cosmedin in the consistory of 14 December 1925 by Pope Pius XI. He opted for the order of cardinal priests and his deaconry was elevated pro hac vice in 1935. He participated in the conclave of 1939 that elected Pope Pius XII. He was appointed Archpriest of the Basilica di Santa Maria Maggiore. When Verde died, he was both the oldest living cardinal and the Cardinal protoprete as the longest-serving member of the college (which is actually a relatively rare occurrence).

He died in 1958 two days after his 93rd birthday and is buried in his family's tomb in Sant'Antimo.

Sources
 Cardinals of the Holy Roman Church

1865 births
1958 deaths
People from the Province of Naples
20th-century Italian cardinals
Pontifical Roman Seminary alumni